Gayraliaceae is a family of green algae in the order Ulotrichales.

References

Ulvophyceae families
Ulotrichales